Air Link International Airways is an airline based in Pasay, Metro Manila, Philippines. It operates charter services and a flying school. Its main base is Ninoy Aquino International Airport.

History

The airline was established on 10 October 1983 and started operations in 1984.

Fleet
The airline has one NAMC YS-11. The aircraft was substantially damaged in a landing accident in 2006.

Accidents and Incidents 
On November 16, 2006, an aircraft chartered by the Central Bank of The Philippines operating the route Tacloban-Manila was severely damaged after veering off the runway at Manila. All nine passengers and crew evacuated safely.

References

Airlines of the Philippines
Airlines established in 1983
Companies based in Pasay
Philippine companies established in 1983